Thomas McTigue (born 1959) is an American actor and comedian. He is best known for playing Harvey Miller on the 1990s television series Baywatch. He made guest appearances on numerous television programs: Beverly Hills, 90210 in 1991 as Jack and on Roseanne in 1994 as a doctor. He has also appeared in several films and hundreds of commercials.  He has a minor part as a teacher in the 2014 film Boyhood.

Biography
Tom McTigue was born and grew up in Spokane, Washington. He studied theatre at Washington State University. After moving to New York to study acting, he returned to Seattle where he acted in regional plays. He eventually became interested in stand up comedy and began performing on the road.

Filmography

References

External links

Living people
American male television actors
20th-century American male actors
21st-century American male actors
American male film actors
Washington State University alumni
Male actors from Spokane, Washington
American male comedians
1959 births
20th-century American comedians
21st-century American comedians